Austrocochlea brevis is a species of sea snail, a marine gastropod mollusk in the family Trochidae, the top snails.

Description
The size of the shell varies between 13 mm and 26 mm.

Distribution
This marine shell occurs off Tasmania.

References

External links
 To Barcode of Life (1 barcode)
 To Encyclopedia of Life
 To GenBank (11 nucleotides; 5 proteins)
 To World Register of Marine Species
 

 brevis
Gastropods of Australia
Gastropods described in 1994